Ludford may refer to:

Places

England
Ludford, Lincolnshire, a village and parish in Lincolnshire
RAF Ludford Magna, a former Royal Air Force base in Lincolnshire
Ludford, Shropshire, a village and parish in Shropshire (formerly in Herefordshire)

People

Surname
Sarah Ludford, Baroness Ludford (b. 1951), a British politician
Nicholas Ludford, English Renaissance composer

First name
Ludford Docker (b. 1860), an English businessman and cricketer